Eliya XII ( / Elīyā, d. 1804) was Patriarch of the Church of the East, from 1778 to 1804, with formal residence in Rabban Hormizd Monastery, near Alqosh, in modern Iraq. His birth name was Ishoyahb, and he was the elder son of priest Abraham, who was brother of the previous patriarch Eliya XI (1722-1778). In 1744, Ishoyahb was consecrated as metropolitan, and designated as presumptive successor (natar kursya) by his paternal uncle, patriarch Eliya XI, who died in 1778, and Ishoyahb succeeded him, as patriarch Eliya XII. His tenure was marked by a prolonged rivalry with his pro-Catholic cousin Yohannan Hormizd, who also claimed the patriarchal throne. In 1804, Eliya XII died and was buried in the Rabban Hormizd Monastery, as the last patriarch of the senior Eliya line.

In older historiography, he was designated as Eliya XII, but later renumbered as Eliya "XIII" by some authors. After the resolution of several chronological questions, he was designated again as Eliya XII, and that numeration is generally accepted in recent scholarly works, with some exceptions.

Biography
Predesignated for the ecclesiastical career, as nephew of patriarch Eliya XI, he was appointed metropolitan in 1744, and became presumptive successor (natar kursya) of the patriarchal throne. His initial name was Ishoyahb (Īshō'yahb), but upon assuming the patriarchal throne in 1778 he took the traditional name Eliya. His cousin and long-time rival Yohannan Hormizd later claimed that in the spring of 1776, patriarch Eliya XI dismissed Ishoyahb and appointed him (Yohannan) as metropolitan and designated successor, but later scholarly research of primary sources, including those from 1777, showed that Ishoyahb was still serving as metropolitan and patriarchal successor.

As the new patriarch, since 1778, Eliya XII was faced with several complex problems, inherited from his predecessors. Long rivalry between two coexisting traditionalist patriarchal branches, the senior Eliya line of Alqosh and the junior Shimun line of Qochanis, represented a major obstacle for the consolidation of the Church of the East. Both patriarchs, Eliya XII of the senior line, and his rival Shimun XVI of the junior line, had their own hierarchies, that continued to assert their separate jurisdictions over the same flock, thus prolonging internal divisions. In the same time, both sides were faced with additional challenges, caused by the ever-worsening position of local Christian communities in frontier war-torn regions between two mighty empires (Ottoman and Persian).

In order to overcome the division between two traditionalist patriarchal lines, one side had to make concessions. Already in 1784, Eliya XII appointed his nephew Hananisho (d. 1813) as metropolitan of Amadiya, thus intending to secure the future patriarchal succession in his family. During the following years, metropolitan Hananisho demonstrated some pro-Catholic tendencies, but they were not accepted as sincere by Rome, thus leading Hananisho to take the opposite, contra-Catholic stance.

By the end of the patriarchal tenure of Eliya XII, the question of succession remained unresolved. He died in 1804, and was buried in the Rabban Hormizd Monastery. His branch decided not to elect a new patriarch, thus breaking the long-standing practice, and eventually enabling the patriarch Shimun XVI Yohannan (1780–1820) of the junior line to become the sole primate of the entire traditionalist community.

During his tenure, Eliya XII was faced with additional challenges, represented by a growing pro-Catholic movement. In 1780, a group seceded from his jurisdiction and elected his young cousin Yohannan Hormizd (b. 1760) as their leader. That group entered into communion with the Catholic Church. In 1783, Yohannan Hormizd was appointed by Rome as new Eastern-Catholic Archbishop of Mosul and patriarchal administrator of the Chaldean Catholic Church. Learning of the death of Eliya XII in 1804, pro-Catholic parties aimed to take over the ancient Rabban Hormizd Monastery, and eventually succeeded, firstly in 1808, and finally in 1813, thus asserting Eastern-Catholic jurisdiction over that ancient monastic institution, that was the main patriarchal residence since the 15th century.

See also
 Patriarch of the Church of the East
 List of Patriarchs of the Church of the East
 List of Patriarchs of the Assyrian Church of the East
 Assyrian Church of the East

References

Sources

External links 

Patriarchs of the Church of the East
18th-century bishops of the Church of the East
1804 deaths
Year of birth missing
Assyrians from the Ottoman Empire
18th-century archbishops
19th-century bishops of the Assyrian Church of the East
19th-century archbishops
18th-century people from the Ottoman Empire
19th-century people from the Ottoman Empire
Bishops in the Ottoman Empire